Institut International de Lancy (IIL) is private international school located in Geneva, with Bilingual, French, and English programmes for students from 3 to 19 years old.

History
Collège Marie-Thérèse was founded in 1903 soon after a law in France prohibited religious congregations of any persuasion. In its early years the Collège was attended by approximately sixty girls, mainly boarders, from across Europe. The 1950s and 1960s were a period of expansion for the school resulting in several major changes: co-education was introduced throughout the school, and the curriculum was modified in order to provide pupils with a more personal curriculum at the higher secondary level. In April 2001, the name of the school was changed to Institut International de Lancy. An English-language primary section was created the same year; an English-language secondary section followed in 2005. The school opened a bilingual section in 2007. Since the start of 2020–2021 school year, IIL has put in place the Kiva and anti-bullying programme for all students and staff. IIL is the first school in Switzerland to join the programme.

Tuition
The school costs about 20,000 for primary and 25,000 for secondary without school bus option and canteen option. Extracurricular activities are not free though cheaper than other places.

Curriculum
The school uses a curriculum of core and foundation subjects within a structure that follows the English National Curriculum («Cambridge International Examinations») and the Baccalauréat en France. The school also provides the IB (International Baccalaureate) since 2009 and the preparation to the Examen de Maturité Suisse.

References

Interview of Francisco Benavente; KiVa Coordinator

External links 
 
 Institut International de Lancy

International schools in Switzerland
Private schools in Switzerland
International Baccalaureate schools in Switzerland